The 2006 Players' Championships Grand Slam  of curling tournament, was held April 13–16 at the Stampede Corral in Calgary, Alberta. Following the merger of the World Curling Tour and the Women's World Curling Tour, it became the first Players' Championship to feature a women's event. It was the last event of the 2005-06 curling season. The men's event, sponsored by the Calgary Herald, featured a purse of $150,000, with the winning team receiving $50,000, while the women's event, called the BDO Classic Women's Players' Championship had a purse of $100,000 with the top team receiving $30,000.

The men's final was an all-Edmonton affair, with Randy Ferbey and his foursome defeating the rival Kevin Martin rink 8–5. It was Ferbey's first Players' title. The team had not played many Grand Slam events prior to the season, due to the prior conflict between the Tour and the Brier, which saw many of the top teams in the country boycott Canada's national men's champion. Ferbey, who was not part of the boycott had won four Briers during this period, but due to his lack of Tour success, his team had critics of their abilities. With the win, Ferbey said "the critics now can shove it you know where. There's not questioning anything now". 

In the women's final, Jennifer Jones of Winnipeg defeated Cheryl Bernard of Calgary 10–8. The two finals were played at the same time in front of about 1,000 spectators. 

The playoffs were shown television on Rogers Sportsnet.

Format
For both the men's and women's events, there were 15 teams divided into three round-robin pools of five. The top two teams in each pool made the 8-team single-elimination playoff, plus two wild card teams.

Men's

Round-robin standings

Tie breakers
 Randy Ferbey 7-6  Jim Cotter
 Pierre Charette 7-6  Jeff Stoughton
 Pete Fenson 6-4  Bruce Korte

Playoffs

Final

Women's

Round-robin standings
Source: 

Tie breakers
 Kelly Scott 6-2  Janet Harvey
 Renee Sonnenberg 7-6  Amber Holland
 Cathy King 9-4  Heather Rankin
 Debbie McCormick 7-4  Anne Merklinger

Playoffs

Final

References

External links
Men's event results 
Women's event results

Players Championships, 2006
Curling competitions in Calgary
Players' Championship
2006 in Alberta